Crotonia or Crotonia may refer to:

 Crotonia, a genus of mite
 Crotonia, a literary society